The Youngstown Elser Metro Airport  is a general aviation airport located 7 miles southwest of Youngstown in Beaver Township, Mahoning County, Ohio, United States. It has a 10/28 asphalt runway  in dimension.

See also
Lansdowne Airport
Salem Airpark
Youngstown Executive Airport
Youngstown-Warren Regional Airport

References

Airports in Ohio
Buildings and structures in Mahoning County, Ohio
Transportation in Mahoning County, Ohio